Cora fuscodavidiana is a species of basidiolichen in the family Hygrophoraceae. Found in Colombia, it was formally described as a new species in 2016 by Robert Lücking, Bibiana Moncada, and Leidy Yasmín Vargas-Mendoza. The specific epithet fuscodavidiana combines the Latin word fuscus ("brown") with the first name of mycologist David Leslie Hawksworth. The lichen is only known to occur at the type locality in the Sumapaz Páramo, where it grows on rocks and in shaded bryophyte and lichen mats.

References

fuscodavidiana
Lichen species
Lichens described in 2016
Lichens of Colombia
Taxa named by Robert Lücking
Basidiolichens